

UDFj-39546284 is a high-redshift Lyman-break galaxy discovered by the Hubble Space Telescope in infrared Hubble Ultra-Deep Field (HUDF) observations in 2009. The object, located in the Fornax constellation, was identified by G. Illingworth (UC Santa Cruz), R. Bouwens (UC Santa Cruz and Leiden University) and the HUDF09 Team during 2009 and 2010. It was reported with a redshift of z~10 using Hubble and Spitzer Space Telescope photometric data, with later reports in 2012 suggesting a possibly higher redshift of z = 11.9
Although doubts were raised that this galaxy could instead be a low-redshift interloper with extreme
spectral emission lines producing the appearance of a very high redshift source, later spectroscopic observations by the James Webb Space Telescope's NIRSpec instrument in 2022 confirmed the galaxy's high redshift to a spectroscopically confirmed estimate of z = 11.58.

Gallery

See also 
 EGSY8p7
 Hubble Ultra-Deep Field
 List of the most distant astronomical objects
 MACS0647-JD
 Reionization
 UDFy-38135539

References

External links 

 UDFj-39546284 on WikiSky

20110127
Fornax (constellation)
Dwarf galaxies
Hubble Space Telescope
Hubble Ultra-Deep Field